Kirit Pradyot Manikya Deb Barma Bahadur is the current head of the Tripuri royal family and is the titular king. He was born in New Delhi, and now resides in Agartala, Tripura. He also served as the editor of TNT-The Northeast Today. He is the current chairman of The Indigenous Progressive Regional Alliance also known as TIPRA Motha. He is known as 'Bubagra' among his people and is one of the active voices for the rights of Indigenous Tripuri people of Tripura.

Early life 
Bubagra Pradyot Manikya was born at New Delhi on 4 July 1978 as the first son of Maharaja Kirit Bikram Kishore Debbarma.(The 185th King of Tripura) and Maharani Bhibu Kumari Devi. His childhood days were spent in Shillong, Meghalaya at the Tripura castle. Also, his initial to higher education was from Shillong itself.

Political career 

Pradyot Manikya's work, philanthropy, activism, and politics revolves around the sociopolitical, economic, and cultural development of the indigenous people of Tripura.

As a youth, Pradyot Manikya was an active Indian National Congress politician. His father Kirit Bikram Debbarma was a three-time MP and his mother Bibhu Kumari, a two-time Congress MLA who had served as the Revenue Minister of Tripura. Although Pradyot did not contest election until the 2021 TTAADC election, he had remained active in protest, agitations and movement for the Tipra people of Tripura.

In the 2018 Lok Sabha election, he was an active campaigner for his sister Maharaj Kumari Pragya Debbarma who contested for the Tripura East. He had also tried to forge a regional alliance during that period which did not happen.

2019-

After the fallout with the Tripura Pradesh Congress in 2019, Bubagra Pradyot Manikya resigned from the President post over the dispute of NRC case filing and took a break from active politics. However, he started to gain voice and support for his agitation against the Citizenship Amendment Bill, 2018 (now an act). He also jointly filed a case with TPF Supremo Patal Kanya Jamatia in the Supreme Court to revoke CAA in the state of Tripura and enforce NRC with the cut off year as 1951.

2020–Present

Positions 

 Chairman of The Indigenous Progressive Regional Alliance (TIPRA)
Chairman of the Club Heritage - Tripura Castle Hotel
Current Head of The Tripura Royal Family
 Former Member of the All India Congress Committee
 Advisor to the Northeast Students Committee, Delhi
 Advisor to the Northeast Regional Development Association (NERDA)
 Chairman of the Royal Tripura Foundation;
 Former Member of the governing council of Tripura Central University
 Former General Secretary Tripura Pradesh Congress
 Former President of Tripura Pradesh Congress

Public life, activism and opinions 
Bubagra Pradyot is quite active in his public life and can be seen having taken part on several occasions like the TEDx Talks. On 16 February 2020, he organized a Q&A interactive session with students at Townhall, Agartala where he talked and discussed about leadership, clarity and issues like Citizenship Amendment Act with the students present. He also suggested that a scholarship in the name of Maharaja Bir Bikram be started by the Government of Tripura rather than putting up a statue.

He launched The Northeast Today, a magazine targeted at residents of India's northeastern states. This enjoys a readership just shy of 1,000,000. He resigned and sold his magazine in November 2019 to concentrate on his own regional platform The Indigenous Progressive regional alliance popularly known as TIPRA. He is one of India's most vocal critics of the Armed Forces Special Powers Act (AFSPA) and is a prolific guest speaker at universities, the most notable being Harvard. He has been active in protesting against the CAA since the passing of the bill in 2019 at the parliament.

Filmography

Films

References

External links
 
 

1978 births
Living people
Indian maharajas
Indian royalty
Kings of Tripura
People from Agartala
Tripura politicians
Indian National Congress politicians from Tripura
Pretenders